Lille Kamøya (meaning "little" Kamøya) may refer to the following places in Norway:

Lille Kamøya, Gamvik, an island in Gamvik municipality, Finnmark county
Lille Kamøya, Hammerfest, an island in Hammerfest municipality, Finnmark county
Lille Kamøya, Nordkapp, an island in Nordkapp municipality, Finnmark county

See also
Store Kamøya (disambiguation)